Vermeil is a combination of precious metals used as a component in jewelry.

Vermeil may also refer to:

Vermeil Room, in the White House
Dick Vermeil (born 1936), American football coach
Edmond Vermeil (1878–1964), French academic
An old name for garnet

See also
Vermeille (disambiguation)